George Phippen (July 11, 1915 – April 13, 1966) was an American sculptor and painter from Arizona. He was the co-founder and first president of the Cowboy Artists of America. He is the namesake of the Phippen Museum in Prescott, Arizona.

Early life
Phippen was born in 1915 in Charles City, Iowa. He grew up as a cowboy in Kansas, and he received no formal art education. When he was serving in World War II, he taught himself to paint. After the war, he briefly worked with artist Henry Balink in Santa Fe, New Mexico.

Career
Over the course of twenty years, Phippen did approximately 3,000 works in his brief career. He was a sculptor and painter in representational style of western genre, figures, horses and cattle. His work included the bronze sculpture Cowboy in a Storm.

Phippen was a member of the Mountain Artists Guild. He was also a co-founder of the Cowboy Artists of America, and he served as its first president.

Personal life, death and legacy
Phippen married Louise Goble. They had five children, and they resided in Skull Valley near Prescott, Arizona.

Phippen died of cancer in 1966 in Skull Valley, at age 50. The Phippen Museum was established in 1975. His widow authored a book about him in 1983.

References

Further reading

External links 
 George Phippen on AskART
 Phippen Museum
 Artifacts List

1915 births
1966 deaths
People from Charles City, Iowa
People from Yavapai County, Arizona
United States Army personnel of World War II
American male sculptors
20th-century American sculptors
20th-century American male artists
American male painters
20th-century American painters
Artists of the American West
Deaths from cancer in Arizona